Nokrat (Noqrat) is a rural locality (a village) in Bayguzinsky Selsoviet, Yanaulsky District, Bashkortostan, Russia. The population was 74 as of 2010. There are 2 streets.

Geography 
Nokrat is located 14 km southwest of Yanaul (the district's administrative centre) by road. Stary Artaul is the nearest rural locality.

References 

Rural localities in Yanaulsky District